Blue periwinkle refers to:

 Austrolittorina unifasciata, a sea-snail of Australasia and the South Pacific
 Vinca major, a flowering plant native to the Western Mediterranean